Aleksandr Aleksandrovich Yermakov (born 18 July 2001) is a Russian football player. He plays for FC Khimik Dzerzhinsk.

Club career
He made his debut in the Russian Professional Football League for FC Mordovia Saransk on 27 May 2018 in a game against FC Ural-2 Yekaterinburg. He made his Russian Football National League debut for Mordovia on 3 March 2019 in a game against FC Tambov.

References

External links
 

2001 births
People from Torbeyevsky District
Sportspeople from Mordovia
Living people
Association football forwards
Russian footballers
FC Mordovia Saransk players
FC Sokol Saratov players
FC Khimik Dzerzhinsk players
Russian First League players
Russian Second League players